Soviet studies may refer to:

 Soviet and communist studies, a field of historical studies
 Europe-Asia Studies, formerly Soviet Studies, an academic peer-reviewed journal